The 1999 South Asian Football Federation Gold Cup is an international football tournament held in India from 22 Aprril to 1 May 1999. The six national teams involved in the tournament were required to register a squad of 23 players, including three goalkeepers. Only players in these squads were eligible to take part in the tournament.

India
Coach:  Sukhwinder Singh
Bhaichung Bhutia
Roberto Fernandes
Virender Singh
Carlton Chapman
Shanmugam Venkatesh
Jules Alberto Dias
I.M. Vijayan
Bruno Coutinho
Daljit Singh
Ranjan Dey
Reazul Mustafa
Basudeb Mondal
Jo Paul Ancheri
Syed Sabir Pasha
Deepak Kumar Mondal
Prabhjot Singh
Prasanta Dora
Kalyan Chaubey
Ram Pal
Hardip Singh Gill

Bangladesh
Coach:  Samir Shaker
Alfaz Ahmed
Rajani Kanta Barman
Hassan Al-Mamun
Aminul Haque
Iqbal Hussain
Motiur Rahman Munna
Monwar Hossain
Mustafa Anwar Parvez Babu
Pradeep Kumar Poddar
Jewel Rana
Mizanur Rahman Dawn
Rakib Hossain
Shahajuddin Tipu
Shahin Hossain
Sourav Majumder Raju

Pakistan
Coach:  PFF coaching committees
Haroon Yousaf
Abdul Ghaffar
Mohammad Tariq
Muhammad Younis
Syed Nasir Ismail
Mohammad Arshad
Mohammed Amir Khan
Bashir Ahmad
Babar Mehmood
Zahid Rafiq
Muhammad Umar
Shahid Saleem
Tanveer Ahmed
Sarfraz Rasool

Sri Lanka
Coach:  M. Karathu
Isuru Perera
Imthyas Raheem
Dudley Lincoln Steinwall
Sugath Dammika Thilakaratne
Imran Mohamed
Samantha Prabath Mudiyanselage
Roshan Perera
Kamaldeen Mohamed Anees
Mohamed Amanulla
Kamaldeen Kabeer
TN Bagoos
Kasun Jayasuriya
F Fowzan

Maldives
Coach:  Vyacheslav Solokho
Mohamed Ibrahim
Hussain Luthfy
Yoosuf Yoottey Azeem
Mohamed Hussain
Ali Shiham
Mohamed Thoddoo Nizam
Shah Ismail
Ali Shahin
Ishak Essa
Mohamed Wildhan
Abdullah Waheed
Abdul Ghafoor Mausoom
Ali Umar
Ashraf Luthfy
Mohamed Nazeeh

Nepal
Coach:  Torsten Spittler
Sukra Man Tamang
Ramesh Budhathoki
Hari Khadka
Basanta Thapa
Dev Narayan Chaudhary
Sandesh Shrestha
Rakesh Shrestha
Upendra Man Singh
Bal Gopal Maharjan
Naresh Joshi
Bahadur Amatya Deepak
Kumar Thapa
Deepak Ranamagar
Deepak Lama

References

1999 in Asian football
1999 in Indian sport
Asian football clubs in international competitions
SAFF Championship
Association football tournament squads
SAFF Championship squads